Noemi Zbären (born 12 March 1994 in Langnau im Emmental) is a Swiss hurdler. At the 2012 Summer Olympics, she competed in the Women's 100 metres hurdles, coming 6th in her heat with a time of 13.33 seconds.

Achievements

References

External links
Profile at IAAF website

Swiss female hurdlers
1994 births
Living people
Olympic athletes of Switzerland
Athletes (track and field) at the 2012 Summer Olympics
Athletes (track and field) at the 2016 Summer Olympics
Athletes (track and field) at the 2010 Summer Youth Olympics
World Athletics Championships athletes for Switzerland
European Athletics Rising Star of the Year winners
People from Emmental District
European Games competitors for Switzerland
Athletes (track and field) at the 2019 European Games
Sportspeople from the canton of Bern
21st-century Swiss women